The 1928–29 Football League season was Birmingham Football Club's 33rd in the Football League and their 16th in the First Division. They finished in 15th position in the 22-team division. They also competed in the 1928–29 FA Cup, entering at the third round proper and losing to Chelsea in the fourth. Bournemouth and Boscombe Athletic manager Leslie Knighton succeeded Bill Harvey at the start of this season.

Twenty-five players made at least one appearance in nationally organised competition, and there were twelve different goalscorers. Full-back Jack Randle played in 43 of the 44 matches over the season, and Joe Bradford was leading scorer for the eighth successive year, with 24 goals, or which 22 came in the league.

Off the field, the Yorkshire Post reported that the club declared a loss of nearly £7,300.

Football League First Division

League table (part)

FA Cup

Appearances and goals

Players with name struck through and marked  left the club during the playing season.

See also
Birmingham City F.C. seasons

References
General
 Matthews, Tony (1995). Birmingham City: A Complete Record. Breedon Books (Derby). .
 Matthews, Tony (2010). Birmingham City: The Complete Record. DB Publishing (Derby). .
 Source for match dates and results: "Birmingham City 1928–1929: Results". Statto Organisation. Retrieved 12 May 2012.
 Source for lineups, appearances, goalscorers and attendances: Matthews (2010), Complete Record, pp. 298–99.
 Source for kit: "Birmingham City". Historical Football Kits. Retrieved 22 May 2018.

Specific

Birmingham City F.C. seasons
Birmingham